Histone chaperone ASF1A is a protein that in humans is encoded by the ASF1A gene.

Function 

This gene encodes a member of the H3/H4 family of histone chaperone proteins and is similar to the anti-silencing function-1 gene in yeast. The protein is a key component of a histone donor complex that functions in nucleosome assembly. It interacts with histones H3 and H4, and functions together with a chromatin assembly factor during DNA replication and repair.

Interactions 

ASF1A has been shown to interact with TLK1, TLK2, CHAF1B and CHAF1A.

References

Further reading

External links